St. Adalbert Parish may refer to:

 St. Adalbert Parish (Enfield, Connecticut)
 St. Adalbert Parish, South Bend, Indiana
 St. Adalbert Parish, Hyde Park, Massachusetts
 St. Adalbert's Parish (Providence, Rhode Island)

See also
 St. Adalbert's Church (disambiguation)